Domitia lupanaria is a species of beetle in the family Cerambycidae. It was described by James Thomson in 1858. It is known from Gabon.

References

Endemic fauna of Gabon
Lamiini
Beetles described in 1858